Gone to Earth is the second studio album by British singer-songwriter David Sylvian, released on 1 September 1986 on Virgin Records. A double album, Gone to Earth is the follow-up to his debut record, Brilliant Trees, and peaked at No. 24 in the UK Albums Chart.

History
The album is a two-record set featuring one record of experimental rock songs with vocals and one consisting entirely of ambient instrumental tracks. Guest artists include Robert Fripp (who co-wrote three songs) and Bill Nelson (who co-wrote one). The album was recorded through 1985 and mid-1986 at Jam Studios in North London, Eel Pie Studios and at The Manor Studios in Oxfordshire, England, with producer Steve Nye. Sylvian said in 1987: "I'd have liked to have recorded it all at Shipton Manor but we ran out of studio time. The rest of the album was done in Townhouse Studios, London. I find that most of the work that was completed in London was substandard compared to the work that was completed in Oxfordshire."

Initially, Sylvian started on a variety of different musical projects that didn't have a specific direction. He composed the film soundtrack Steel Cathedrals and the work Words with the Shaman, and worked on the songs "Wave", "Before The Bullfight" and "Laughter And Forgetting", that added up to a body of work that he felt was an incoherent collection of material. He persuaded Virgin Records to release Words with the Shaman as a 12" EP, and Steel Cathedrals was put aside for a video release only. Sylvian then concentrated on the songs he was working on with the intention to develop them and flesh it out to a full album. At the time he was also writing short instrumental pieces and wanted to pursue them as well. Sylvian's record company were not particularly interested in his instrumental compositions, and funded the recording only of the songs on Disc 1 of the set, with Sylvian funding and recording the instrumentals on Disc 2 in his own time.

Sylvian, as on his earlier solo albums, continued to reference artists, writers and thinkers who were influencing him, though here he utilised the technique of using, within certain songs, snippets of the voices of particular figures. These include J.G. Bennett, Robert Graves and Joseph Beuys. The song "Laughter and Forgetting" was partly inspired by Milan Kundera's novel The Book of Laughter and Forgetting, though only via the lyrics, and not via the 'voice snippet' technique.

The album peaked at no. 24 in the UK albums chart and has been certified Silver by the British Phonographic Industry for sales in excess of 60,000 copies.
The original cover art by Russell Mills was largely inspired by Sylvian's then-current interest in Rosicrucianism and Gnosticism, particularly the writings of Robert Fludd.

Original UK, US and Japanese CD pressings omit four of the instrumentals: "Silver Moon Over Sleeping Steeples", "Camp Fire: Coyote Country", "A Bird of Prey Vanishes into a Bright Blue Cloudless Sky" and "Sunlight Seen Through Towering Trees". Later Japanese CD editions and the Weatherbox box set both included the complete album on two discs. In 2003, the album was re-released in a double-disc format that mirrors the original vinyl release, and included three bonus remixes, while shortening the intro to "Before the Bullfight".

In February 2019, as part of a redesigned monochrome sleeved vinyl reissue batch of his 1980s material, Gone To Earth was released as a double album with a black-and-white picture of Sylvian replacing the original artwork. No new mastering was done for this; the 2003 remaster was used.

Critical reception
Gone to Earth was well received by the contemporary British music press. [[Sounds (magazine)|''Sounds]] Chris Roberts praised the album: "it's the perfect realisation of artist converting image to mood, subverting fantasy to super-reality. Delicate, but with the strength of legions, it's an Eighties masterpiece and conceivably his finest approximation of distilled beauty ever... [Gone to Earth] is almost as breathtaking as it is life giving."

Track listing
Original vinyl and Weatherbox CD pressings

For Weatherbox, Disc 1 included sides A and B, while Disc 2 included sides C and D.

Original CD pressing

2003 CD pressing

PersonnelMusiciansDavid Sylvian – lead vocals, keyboards (A1, A3, B1, B2, B3), guitar (A1, A3, A4, B2) electronics (A1, A2)
Robert Fripp – guitar (A1, A4, B1, B2, B3, D1, D5), Frippertronics (A4, B1, B2, B3)
Steve Jansen – drums (A1, A3, B1, B2, B3)
Phil Palmer – acoustic guitar (A1)
Jennifer Maidman – bass (A1, B2, B3)
Kenny Wheeler – flugelhorn (A2, A3)
John Taylor – piano (A2)
Bill Nelson – guitar (A3, B1, B3, C1, C2, D4)
Richard Barbieri – electronics (A3, B1)
Harry Beckett – flugelhorn (B1)
Mel Collins – soprano saxophone (B2, B3)
B.J. Cole – pedal steel (B3, C5)
Joseph Beuys – voice (C1)
John G. Bennett – voice (A4)
Robert Graves – voice (D5)Technical'''
Russell Mills – design
David Buckland – photography
Steve Nye – engineer, piano (C3)
Nick Blundell- assistant engineer
Julian Wheatley assistant engineer
Noel Haris – assistant engineer
Catherine Wilson – assistant engineer
Yuka Fujii – special thanks

Charts

References

1986 albums
David Sylvian albums
Albums produced by Steve Nye
Virgin Records albums
Albums with cover art by Russell Mills (artist)